Dwellers in the Crucible is a 1985 science fiction novel by American writer by Margaret Wander Bonanno, part of the  Star Trek: The Original Series franchise. A bestseller, it was the author's breakout novel, retelling the central Star Trek story of the friendship between James T. Kirk and Spock through the experiences of two female civilians, Egyptian Cleante al Faisal and Vulcan T'Shael. It is noted for its emphasis on interpersonal relationships over action, and for the minimal role played in the story by the franchise's established characters.

Plot
On the planet Vulcan, several representatives of each Federation world are kept as "Warrantors of the Peace". As close relatives of the leaders of their worlds, they serve as hostages against the actions of their planetary governments, and are immediately killed if their world attacks another Federation planet.

Six of these Warrantors - an Andorian, a human, a Vulcan and three Deltans - are kidnapped and held by the Romulan Empire. The Andorian is killed during the kidnap, and the three Deltans are tortured to death by their Klingon captors, acting for the Romulans.  The plot focuses on the cultural differences and eventual friendship between the two surviving captives, T'Shael and Cleante.

Themes
Bonanno's concept of "Warrantors of the Peace" appears to be an implementation of Roger Fisher's 1981 proposal that the officer who accompanies the President of the United States with nuclear launch codes should have those codes implanted in his heart, to be cut out by the President's hand in the event of war:

In a 2019 interview, Bonanno described the practice of taking hostages to maintain peace with an enemy power as "a custom that [goes] back to ancient times. In order to secure against invasion, local leaders would send one of their sons to be raised by a former ally. If either side invaded anyway, the boy was sacrificed. Seems rather primitive by our lights, but I guess it worked most of the time."

Reception and legacy
Dwellers was positively received at publication. While Fantasy Review emphasised the regular cast's incidental appearance in the novel, they recommended it highly despite its "minor flaws": "Dwellers in the Crucible is an excellent study of values ... [t]here are things here to think about which belie the Star Trek image."

Later, recalling Dwellers in 2009, author Keith R. A. DeCandido would describe the impact the "cool" story had on him: "I didn't know that a Star Trek book could do that."

Controversy
In 1992, Bonanno was contracted by Pocket Books to write a follow-up novel to Star Trek IV: The Voyage Home. Her manuscript, entitled Music of the Spheres, reintroduced Dwellers characters Cleante and T'Shael. As Dwellers had done, Music focused on Bonanno's characters rather than on the familiar characters from the television show. This had not been a difficulty in 1985, but by 1992 Paramount Pictures had introduced new standards for Star Trek tie-in novels, which outlawed extensive use of original characters.

The story was heavily rewritten, and that rewrite subsequently rewritten by Gene DeWeese. The derivative novel was eventually published as Probe, still naming Bonanno as the author. Despite her wishes, Pocket Books refused to strip her name from the book. Bonanno stated at the time that only one page of the published novel resembled what she had written.

References

External links

Novels based on Star Trek: The Original Series
1985 American novels
American science fiction novels
Pocket Books books